GRB 221009A also known as Swift J1913.1+1946 was an unusually bright and long-lasting gamma-ray burst (GRB) jointly discovered by the Neil Gehrels Swift Observatory and the Fermi Gamma-ray Space Telescope on October 9, 2022. The gamma-ray burst lasted for more than ten hours since detection, and could briefly be observed by amateur astronomers. This is also one of the closest gamma-ray bursts and is among the most energetic and luminous bursts. It is a rare opportunity for researchers to study it and events like it in detail. GRB 221009A came from the constellation of Sagitta and occurred an estimated 1.9 billion years ago, at a distance of 2.4 billion light-years away from Earth.

The burst oversaturated the Fermi Gamma-ray Space Telescope, which captured photons whose energies exceeded 100 GeV. The Large High Altitude Air Shower Observatory (LHAASO) in China saw 5,000 high-energy photons. (For comparison, in the entire history of the study of gamma-ray bursts, astronomers have detected only hundreds of these.) Some photons even carried a record 18 TeV of energy, which is more than can be produced at the Large Hadron Collider (LHC) at the European Center for Nuclear Research (CERN). Russia's Carpet-2 facility may have recorded a single 251-TeV photon from this burst. This event could help physicists study how matter interacts at relativistic speeds, and potentially physics beyond the Standard Model.

GRB 221009A could be caused by a dying massive star undergoing a supernova, or the birth of a black hole. Some physicists speculate that such exceptionally high-energy photons could come from new physics involving dark matter, axions or decaying sterile neutrinos. Lightning detectors in India and Germany picked up signs of Earth's ionosphere being perturbed for several hours by the burst, though only mildly. Some astronomers referred to the burst as the "brightest of all time", or "BOAT". The afterglow at X-ray energies is a hundreds of times brighter than seen before.

GRB 221009A was subsequently observed by the Neutron Star Interior Composition Explorer (NICER), the Monitor of All-sky X-ray Image (MAXI), the Imaging X-ray Polarimetry Explorer (IXPE), the International Gamma-ray Astrophysics Laboratory (INTEGRAL), the XMM-Newton space telescope, and many others.

Gallery

See also

 List of gamma-ray bursts

References

Gamma-ray bursts
Astronomical objects discovered in 2022